Chunar is a city located in Mirzapur district of Indian state of Uttar Pradesh. It is nearby Mirzapur city.  The railway tracks passing through Chunar Junction railway station leads to major destinations of India, including Howrah, Delhi, Tatanagar and Varanasi. National Highway 35 (old NH7) also passes through Chunar. It is connected to the city of Mirzapur and Varanasi by roads and rails. Chunar is well known for its handicraft products made from clay and plaster of paris. It is also famous for its historical place - Chunar Fort.

History 
The Chunar Fort was established by Maharaja Vikramaditya, the King of Ujjain, in honour of the stay of his brother Raja Bharthari. It is believed that Raja Bharthari left his body and took Mahasamadhi at this fort, a servant disciple is still taking care of the place and offers deepam dhupam to the Raja everyday (as of 8 November 2011).

As per Alha Khand in 1029 AD. King Sahadeo made this fort as his capital and established the statue of Naina Yogini in a cave of Vindhya hill and put the name as Nainagarh. King Sahadeo built a stone umbrella based on 52 pillars in the memory of the victory on 52  other kings, inside the fort which is still preserved. He had a brave daughter who got married with Alha the then King of Mahoba whose marriage place in still preserved with the name of Sonava Mandap. Beside this some other stories are also related with the fort as Magna- Deogarh, Ratan Deo's Burj (tower) and King Pithaura who named it Patthargarh as well.

In mid July 1537, Humayun left Agra and arrived at Chunar after 5 months and spent 3 months besieging the Chunar fort. Humayun later offered Chunar and Jaunpur to Sher Shah Suri in exchange for Bengal.

It has got much importance due to the stay of the founder of Mughal Dynasty Babar in 1525 AD. Later on Shershah Suri obtained the possession of the fort by marrying the widow wife of Taj Khan Sarang-Khani, the Governor of  Ibrahim Lodi.
In 1574 AD. Akbar the great captured this fort and since that very time it was in the Mughal regime up to 1772 AD. Once emperor Jahangir appointed one Iftikhar Khan as Nazim and in the regime of Aurangzeb one of his Governor's Mirza Bairam built a mosque in 1663 AD. near the Bhairo-Burj.

In 1772 AD this fort was captured by East India Company who established in it a depot of Artillery and ammunition. Later it was taken by Maharaja Chait Singh of Benaras temporarily and after Chait Singh outbreak in 1781 AD. Warren Hastings retired for safety to Chunar where a force was collected by Major Phophan, which expelled Chait Singh from his stronghold in his neighbourhood. Hastings liked the situation and climate, his residence is still standing. Near it, there is a sundial bearing the inscription.

Geography
Chunar city is existing in a triangular from on the right bank of holy Ganga and the left bank of the Jargo river. On contrary, the river Ganga sometime overflow its bank, causing situations which somehow looks like a flood. 
In summer, temperature here vary from 32°C to 43°C. On the other hand, in winter it goes from 25°C to 15°C in temperature. and in rainy days, rainfall is 111cms.(annual) approx.+ which is count as average annual rainfall in India (110cm).

Demographics
As of 2011 Indian Census, Chunar had a total population of 37,185, of which 19,647 were males and 17,538 were females. Population within the age group of 0 to 6 years was 4,926. The total number of literates in Chunar was 24,674, which constituted 66.4% of the population with male literacy of 73.5% and female literacy of 58.3%. The effective literacy rate of 7+ population of Chunar was 76.5%, of which male literacy rate was 84.3% and female literacy rate was 67.6%. The Scheduled Castes and Scheduled Tribes population was 5,657 and 119 respectively. Chunar had 5951 households in 2011.

Economy
Chunar is known for producing handicraft items especially statues and toys, cup and plates from clay and plaster of paris.

Post Office
Chunar Post Office is located at Chunar, Chunar, Mirzapur of Uttar Pradesh state. It is a sub office (S.O.). A Post Office (PO) / Dak Ghar is a facility in charge of sorting, processing, and delivering mail to recipients. POs are usually regulated and funded by the Government of India (GOI). Pin code of Chunar PO is 231304. This Post office falls under Mirzapur postal division of the Uttar Pradesh postal circle. The related head P.O. for this sub office is Mirzapur head post office. For more info, Chunar Post Office

In the media
In the latest, there were some scenes in Mirzapur (TV series) which were originally flim in Chunar.
In 2011, The shooting of Anurag Kashyap's film Gangs of Wasseypur took place in Chunar. Before it, in the 90s, Doordarshan series Chandrakanta's shooting also took place in Chunar.

See also
Niyamatpurkala
Chaudharipur

References

External links
Chunar tourism 
Website consists local Info

Cities and towns in Mirzapur district

industries